Reveal is an album by the new wave rock band Fischer-Z. In the summer of 1981 John Watts split up with his group, Fischer-Z, on the grounds that his art could not evolve within the context of the band.  Prompted by the encouragement of the well-received Fischer-Z album, Red Skies Over Paradise, Watts soon embarked on a solo career, releasing his first solo album, One More Twist (1982), followed quickly by his second, The Iceberg Model (1983).  Watts toured extensively and even produced a mini-album for Zulu artist Busi Mhlongo.  He released an album entitled Quick Quick Slow under the name The Cry in 1984.

After touring and releasing an album per year up until 1985 John Watts was trying to resolve his role of constantly touring with that of being a father of two children. Over the ensuing years, he started to develop and record new material with multi-talented musician, Ian Porter.  In 1987 John Watts began to record material under the Fischer-Z name again — but, with one twist — Watts was now the only original member of the group and it was his "musical vision". Original Fischer-Z keyboardist, Steve Skolnik, did, however, make a minor contribution to the album.

Track listing
All songs written by John Watts.

"The Perfect Day" - 4:18
"Leave It to the Businessmen to Die Young" - 4:58
"I Can't Wait That Long" - 4:42
"Tallulah Tomorrow" - 4:37
"Realistic Man" - 3:23
"Fighting Back the Tears" - 4:56
"Big Drum" - 3:44
"Heartbeat" - 3:07
"It Takes Love" - 4:07
"So Far" - 4:00
"Marguerite" - 3:18 (appears only on CD releases)

Charts

Personnel
Fischer-Z
John Watts - lead vocals, guitar
Ian Porter - bass, keyboards, percussion programming
Steve Kellner - drums
Jennie Cruse - vocals
Alan Morrison - guitar
Denis Haines - keyboards
Additional musicians
Pete Sinden - bass on "Fighting Back the Tears" and "Big Drum"
Geoff Dugmore - drums on "Big Drum" and "Heartbeat"
Tim Moore - keyboards on "Big Drum", "Heartbeat" and "It Takes Love"
Steve Greetham - bass on "Heartbeat"
Lorenza Johnson - backing vocals
Judy La Rose - backing vocals on "Heartbeat" and "It Takes Love"
The Sapphires - backing vocals on "It Takes Love"
Marc Fox - percussion on "Heartbeat"
Mike Benn - keyboards on "It Takes Love"
Steve Skolnik - keyboards on "I Can't Wait That Long"
Mickey Donnelly - saxophone on "So Far"
Technical
Kenny Jones, Richard Manwaring, Steve Forward - engineer
Gary Goodman - cover design, artwork

Notes

The album features the singles, "Big Drum" and "The Perfect Day", the latter being one of the most successful singles by Fischer-Z and another single to have a video made for it.

Perfect Day peaked at number 12 on the Australian Charts in 1988.

References

1987 albums
Fischer-Z albums
Arista Records albums